= Aplysamine-2 =

Names
- Preferred IUPAC name (2Z)-3-(3-Bromo-4-methoxyphenyl)-N-(2-{3,5-dibromo-4-[3-(dimethylamino)propoxy]phenyl}ethyl)-2-(hydroxyimino)propanamide

Identifiers
CAS Number	172486-24-7
3D model (JSmol)	Interactive image
ChEMBL	ChEMBL465038
ChemSpider	4919384
PubChem CID	6411696
CompTox Dashboard (EPA)	DTXSID401317884
- InChI: InChI=1S/C23H28Br3N3O4/c1-29(2)9-4-10-33-22-18(25)12-16(13-19(22)26)7-8-27-23(30)20(28-31)14-15-5-6-21(32-3)17(24)11-15/h5-6,11-13,31H,4,7-10,14H2,1-3H3,(H,27,30)/b28-20- Key: RCOAHKXJTMBQLI-RRAHZORUSA-N; InChI=1/C23H28Br3N3O4/c1-29(2)9-4-10-33-22-18(25)12-16(13-19(22)26)7-8-27-23(30)20(28-31)14-15-5-6-21(32-3)17(24)11-15/h5-6,11-13,31H,4,7-10,14H2,1-3H3,(H,27,30)/b28-20- Key: RCOAHKXJTMBQLI-RRAHZORUBY
- SMILES: CN(C)CCCOC1=C(C=C(C=C1Br)CCNC(=O)/C(=N\O)/CC2=CC(=C(C=C2)OC)Br)Br

Properties
Chemical formula	C_{23}H_{28}Br_{3}N_{3}O_{4}
Molar mass	650.198
- Except where otherwise noted, data are given for materials in their standard state (at 25 °C [77 °F], 100 kPa). Infobox references

Aplysamine-2 is a bio-active isolate of marine sponge.
